The discography of the American metalcore/electronicore band Attack Attack!, consists of three studio albums, one extended play, and ten singles. The band went through numerous line-up changes and broke up in 2013, only to reunite in 2020.

The band self-released one extended play, before signing to Rise Records in 2008. Ever since, the band went on to release three studio albums, Someday Came Suddenly (2008), Attack Attack! (2010), and This Means War (2012).

Studio albums

Extended plays

Singles

References

External links
Attack Attack! discography at AllMusic

Discographies of American artists